Matteo Legittimo (born 17 June 1989) is an Italian football player who plays as a defender for  club Potenza.

Club career
He made his professional debut in the Lega Pro for Salernitana on 22 August 2010 in a game against Sorrento. On 16 January 2018, he left Trapani for Lecce, when he was exchanged for Mirko Drudi.

On 26 November 2021, he signed with Fidelis Andria in Serie C.

Honours
Lecce
 Serie C: 2017–18 (Group C)

References

External links
 

1989 births
Living people
Sportspeople from the Province of Lecce
Footballers from Apulia
Italian footballers
Italy youth international footballers
Association football defenders
Serie B players
Serie C players
Lega Pro Seconda Divisione players
U.S. Lecce players
U.S. Pistoiese 1921 players
Paganese Calcio 1926 players
A.S.D. Barletta 1922 players
U.S. Salernitana 1919 players
F.C. Südtirol players
Ascoli Calcio 1898 F.C. players
Parma Calcio 1913 players
F.C. Grosseto S.S.D. players
S.P.A.L. players
Trapani Calcio players
Cosenza Calcio players
S.S. Fidelis Andria 1928 players
Potenza Calcio players
21st-century Italian people